Neend Hamari Khwab Tumhare is a 1966 Indian Hindi-language film directed by Shiv Sahni and produced by Hans Choudhary. It stars Shashi Kapoor and Nanda in pivotal roles.

Synopsis

Nishad (Nanda) lives a wealthy and noble lifestyle with her Delhi-based father, Khan Bahadur Balraj Sahni and mom. She has three suitors who would do anything to marry her. The first is Shaukat Khan Manmohan, the son of Nawab Hamid Khan, who also comes from a noble family and meets with the approval of her dad; the second is Shibbu Rajendra Nath,  who is distantly related to her mom, and also meets their approval; the third is Anwar Shashi Kapoor, the only son of Nawab Ajmutullah Khan Farooqui Om Prakash who was initially rejected by her parents, but is now on their approval list, as they think he, too, comes from a noble background. After a few dates, Nishad falls in love with Anwar, much to the chagrin of Shaukat and Shibbu. What Nishad does not know is that Anwar's dad was a Hajam (Barbar) by profession, and had assumed the title of 'Nawab' after winning a lottery. Watch what happens when all the truths unfolds slowly before Nishad and her parents eyes. Nishads parents find out the whole truth on the very day of her wedding to Anwar.
What will happen? Will the marriage go ahead?

Cast
 Shashi Kapoor as Anwar
 Nanda as Nishad
 Balraj Sahni as Khan Bahadur
 Nirupa Roy as Begum Khan Bahadur
 Om Prakash as Ajju Hajam / Nawab Ajmutullah Khan Farooqui
 Shashikala as Ms. Paul
 Rajendra Nath as Shibbu
 Manmohan as Nawab Shaukat Hamid Khan
 Manorama as Begum Ajmutullah Khan Farooqui
 Anwar Hussain as Dr. Rana
 Lotan as Mir Sahib
 Vishwa Mehra as Fazal
 Bela Bose as Dancer
 Madhumati as Dancer

Soundtrack
Lyrics by: Rajendra Krishan.

External links

1960s Hindi-language films
1966 films